Deadline for Murder is a 1946 American crime film directed by James Tinling and written by Irving Cummings Jr. The film stars Paul Kelly, Kent Taylor, Sheila Ryan, Jerome Cowan, Renee Carson and Marion Martin. The film was released on August 1, 1946, by 20th Century Fox.

Plot

Cast    
Paul Kelly as Lt. Jerry E. McMullen
Kent Taylor as Steve Millard
Sheila Ryan as Vivian Mason
Jerome Cowan as Lynch
Renee Carson as Zita Louise Duvalle
Marion Martin as Laura Gibson
Joan Blair as Helen Blanchard
Leslie Vincent as Paul Blanchard
Eddie Marr as Keller
Matt McHugh as Johnny
Jody Gilbert as Tiny
Emory Parnell as Masseur

References

External links
 

1946 films
American crime films
1946 crime films
20th Century Fox films
Films directed by James Tinling
American black-and-white films
1940s English-language films
1940s American films